The Mercedes-Benz OM647 engine is a straight-5 diesel engine produced by Mercedes-Benz.

This engine utilizes a cast-iron cylinder block and an aluminum cylinder head. The engine is turbocharged and intercooled. This engine also has four valves per cylinder and dual overhead camshafts. 

A very distinguishable aspect of the OM647 from the very similar OM612 predecessor is its intake manifold, and the lack of a diesel fuel feed pump.

See also
 List of Mercedes-Benz engines
 List of engines used in Chrysler products

Sources 
http://sprinter-source.com/wiki/index.php/OM647

OM647
Diesel engines by model
Straight-five engines